Sanaya Pithawalla (born 4 August 1993) is an Indian model and actress. She is best known for her role of Siyali Rajput in MTV's Warrior High (2015) and Aditi Ranaut in Hindi web series The Great Indian Dysfunctional Family (2018). Her upcoming project with ALTBalaji is Dil Hi Toh Hai season 2. Recently she was seen opposite anshuman malhotra in Voot's Fuh Se Fnatasy.

Early life
Sanaya Pithawalla did her schooling from St.Anthony's Girls' High School, Chembur, Mumbai. She starts her modelling career at early age. She started her career with the role of Siyali Rajput in Warriors High. Later she acted in Indian television series Emotional Atyachar season 4 and Gumrah.

Filmography

References

External links

 

Living people
Parsi people
Indian television actresses
1993 births
Parsi people from Mumbai